UCO may refer to:

Organizations
 Central Operative Unit (Spanish: Unidad Central Operativa), a special unit of the Civil Guard of Spain
 UCO Bank, formerly United Commercial Bank

Education
 University of Central Oklahoma, Edmond, Oklahoma, US
 University of California Observatories, a multi-campus astronomical research unit of the University of California, US
 Catholic University of the West (Université catholique de l'Ouest), Angers, France
 Universidad Católica de Oriente, Antioquia, Colombia

Other uses
 UCO, female vocalist of the Japanese band Funta
 Unequal crossing over, a DNA mutation mechanism
 Used cooking oil